The PGPEP1 gene in humans encodes the enzyme Pyroglutamyl-peptidase I.

References

Further reading